The 2015–16 Miami RedHawks women's basketball team represents Miami University during the 2015–16 NCAA Division I women's basketball season. The RedHawks, led by third year head coach Cleve Wright, play their home games at Millett Hall, as members of the East Division of the Mid-American Conference. They finished the season 9–21, 3–15 in MAC play to finish in a tie for fifth place in the East Division. They lost in the first round of the MAC women's tournament to Akron.

Roster

Schedule
Source: 

|-
!colspan=9 style="background:#CE1126; color:white;"| Exhibition

|-
!colspan=9 style="background:#CE1126; color:white;"| Non-conference regular season

|-
!colspan=9 style="background:#CE1126; color:white;"| MAC regular season

|-
!colspan=9 style="background:#CE1126; color:white;"| MAC Women's Tournament

See also
2015–16 Miami RedHawks men's basketball team

References

2015–16 Miami Media Guide

Miami
Miami RedHawks women's basketball seasons